Bakonya is a village in central Baranya County, Pécs District, in southern Hungary. It is located in the western Mecsek mountain range and was the site of a uranium mine from the 1950s to 1989. Its population at the 2011 Census was 335.

Etymology
The name comes from the Slavic bukovina: beech forest.

Geography 
It is part of the Southern Transdanubia statistical region, and administratively it falls under Baranya County and then Pécs District.

Bakonya is located in the western Mecsek Mountains, and the northern half of the village area lies within the Western Mecsek Landscape Protection District, managed by the Danube-Dráva National Park.

The area is rich in minerals in relation to other parts of Hungary, and uranium ore was discovered in sandstone deposits near Bakonya, with production beginning in the mid-1950s. The uranium was of low grade, but production was subsidized by the government until 1989, when the mine closed following the collapse of the Soviet Union, the primary consumer of the ore, rendering the operation no longer economically viable.

Demographics

2011 census 
As of the census of 2011, there were 335 residents, 136 households, and 93 families living in the village. The population density was 58 inhabitants per square mile (22/km2). There were 140 dwellings at an average density of 24 per square mile (9/km2).

There were 136 households, of which 64.0% were one-family households, 2.2% were multi-family households, 30.1% were one-person households, and 3.7% were other non-family households. The average household size was 2.46.

There were 93 families, of which 40.9% were couples living with children, 39.8% were couples living without children, 12.9% were single females with children, and 6.5% were single males with children. The average number of children was 1.13. The average family size was 2.94.

The age breakdown of the village was 21.2% under the age of 20, 7.8% between ages 20 and 24, 25.4% aged 25 to 44, 31.0% aged 45 to 64, and 14.6% aged 65 and older. The gender ratio was 1.06 males to every female.

In terms of educational attainment, 92.6% completed at least primary school, 26.9% completed at least secondary school with final examination, and 5.0% had a higher education degree.

Religious affiliation was 49.9% Roman Catholic, 1.2% Calvinist, 0.9% Lutheran, 0.3% Greek Catholic, 1.2% other religion, and 26% unaffiliated, with 20.6% declining to answer.

The village had an ethnic minority Roma population of 15.2%. The other minority nationality affiliation of note was German (2.1%), with small numbers of Poles, Croats, and others, non-native to Hungary, each constituting less than 1% of the population. The vast majority declared themselves as Hungarian (94.9%), with 3.9% declining to answer.

Local government 
The village is governed by a mayor with a four-person council. The local government of the village operates a joint council office with the nearby localities of Cserkút and Kővágószőlős. The seat of the joint council is in Kővágószőlős.

As of the election of 2019, the village also has a local minority self-government for its Roma community, with three elected representatives.

Mayors since 1990

Transportation

Railway 
 Bicsérd Train Station,  to the south of the village off Road 6601. The station is on the Pusztaszabolcs–Pécs and Gyékényes–Pécs railway lines and is operated by MÁV.

Road 
 Road 6605, which passes through the Mecsek mountain range, connects to Main Road 6 in the south and Hetvehely at Road 6601 in the north.
 Main Road 6, which runs south of the village, connects east-west to Szentlőrinc and Pécs.

Notes

References

External links 
 Bakonya village website (in Hungarian)
 Map of the Western Mecsek Landscape Protection District (in Hungarian)
 Street map 
 OpenStreetMap

Populated places in Baranya County